Wisk'achayuq (Quechua wisk'acha viscacha -yuq a suffix, "the one with viscachas", also spelled Viscachayoj, Wiscachayo) is a mountain in the Bolivian Andes which reaches a height of approximately . It is located in the Chuquisaca Department, on the border of the Jaime Zudáñez Province, Icla Municipality, and the Tomina Province, Sopachuy Municipality.

References 

Mountains of Chuquisaca Department